Michael Raymond George Huckle (born 6 August 1938) is a former Rhodesian cricketer who played a single first-class match for the Rhodesian national side in October 1966.

Born in Bulawayo, Huckle was a left-arm orthodox spinner and a right-handed lower-order batsman. His single first-class appearance came against Transvaal during the 1966–67 Currie Cup, in a three-day match at the Police A Ground in Salisbury (now Harare). In Rhodesia's first innings, Huckle came in eighth in the batting order, scoring 14 not out. Bowling in Transvaal's first innings, he had Ali Bacher, Transvaal's captain and a future captain of the South African national side, caught by Raymond Gripper for 54. He finished with 1/44 from nine six-ball overs, and played little further part in the match as Rhodesia lost by 10 wickets.

Huckle had been selected for Rhodesia on the basis of good form for Matabeleland in the Logan Cup. However, competition from two other spinners, Dave Napier and Neville Deudney, meant he played only a single game for the national side. Huckle later took up farming at Turk Mine, in present-day Matabeleland North Province. He stood as a Rhodesia Party candidate at the 1974 general election, but lost to the Rhodesian Front's Reginald Cowper in the Wankie constituency, getting only 13.9 percent of the vote. Huckle's son, Adam George Huckle, was raised in Turk Mine, and later went on to play Test cricket for Zimbabwe in the 1990s. Mike Huckle remained involved in local cricket, and in March 1991, aged 53, played a game for Matabeleland Country Districts against Ireland. One of his teammates in that match was Denis Streak, another ex-Rhodesian player farming at Turk Mine whose son, Heath Streak, played Tests for Zimbabwe.

References

External links

1938 births
Living people
Rhodesia cricketers
Cricketers from Bulawayo
White Zimbabwean people
Zimbabwean cricketers
Rhodesian farmers